Borbetomagus is the third studio album by Borbetomagus, released in 1982 by Agaric Records.

Track listing

Personnel 
Adapted from Borbetomagus liner notes.

Borbetomagus
 Don Dietrich – saxophone
 Donald Miller – electric guitar
 Jim Sauter – saxophone
Additional musicians
 Brian Doherty – electronics (2)

Production and additional personnel
 Larry Alexander – assistant engineer
 Serban Stanciulescu – recording (1)
 Ted Goldberg – recording (2)
 Elizabeth McGuy – photography

Release history

References

External links 
 

1982 albums
Borbetomagus albums